High-End Crush is a South Korean-Chinese production web drama, starring Jung Il-woo and Jin Se-yeon. It was aired on Sohu TV on Saturdays & Sundays at 00:00 (CST). In just four months, the web drama has recorded over 200 million views in China.
The series is slated to air for the first time in South Korean television on April 4, 2018, on the generalist pay TV channel MBN.

Synopsis
"High End Crush" is a romantic comedy depicting the heartfelt and pure love story by a man with everything in his hands, who falls in love for the first time in his life with a woman, who has been living in completely opposite circumstances from his.

Cast

Main cast 
 Jung Il-woo as Choi Se-hoon
 Jin Se-yeon as Yoo Yi-ryung

Supporting cast 
 Yoon Bo-ra as Kang Min-joo
 Lee Si-eon as Section chief Heo
 Jung Sang-hoon as Jong-hyun
 Moon Se-yoon as Jang Sae-yoon
 Park Hyun-woo as Section chief Park
 Monsta X as themselves
 Soobin as Soo-bin, Min-joo's friend
 Song Won-geun as Yoon Ji-won

Guest cast 
 Kim So-yeon as TV Reporter
 Jung Kyung-ho as TV Reporter

References

External links

High-End Crush at MBN
 High-End Crush at Sohu TV
 High-End Crush at Naver TV

2010s South Korean television series
2015 web series debuts
2016 web series endings
South Korean web series
Comedy web series
Sohu original programming
Naver TV original programming
Maeil Broadcasting Network television dramas
South Korean romantic comedy television series
Television series by Kim Jong-hak Production